Scaptesylodes is a genus of moths of the family Crambidae.

Species
Scaptesylodes incerta Semper, 1899
Scaptesylodes modica Munroe, 1976

References

Spilomelinae
Crambidae genera
Taxa named by Eugene G. Munroe